Pavoraja umbrosa, commonly known as the dusky skate, is a species of fish in the family Arhynchobatidae. It lives off the coast of north-eastern Australia in depths ranging from 360 to 731 meters. Its maximum size is  total length.

Pavoraja umbrosa is a little-known species, although it might be common. Although it can occur as by-catch, current levels of fishing in its range are unlikely to pose a significant threat.

References

Pavoraja
Marine fish of Eastern Australia
Taxa named by Peter R. Last
Taxa named by Stephen Mallick
Taxa named by Gordon K. Yearsley
Fish described in 2008